The William Johnson House, 210 State Street, in Natchez, Mississippi, was constructed in 1840 and was the residence of the free black man William Johnson. Known also as The Barber of Natchez, Johnson constructed his home from the bricks of other buildings destroyed in the tornado of 1840. Today the house is part of the National Historical Park of Natchez, Mississippi.

Gallery

References

National Register of Historic Places in Natchez, Mississippi
Houses completed in 1841
Houses on the National Register of Historic Places in Mississippi
Houses in Natchez, Mississippi
Individually listed contributing properties to historic districts on the National Register in Mississippi
Natchez National Historical Park